The Japan–South Korea Comfort Women Agreement declared that the issue of the comfort women between Japan and South Korea was to be resolved finally and irreversibly. The agreement was announced by the Foreign Ministers of both countries and confirmed by the Prime Minister of Japan and the President of South Korea by a telephone call on 28 December 2015. In 2019, the agreement had been effectively shelved.

Background

An article of East Asia Forum reported that this agreement was pushed by the Obama administration.

Announcement by Foreign Ministers at the Joint Press Occasion
Foreign Ministers of Japan and South Korea held a joint press conference at the Korea-Japan Foreign Ministers' Meeting on 28 December 2015.

Statement by Japanese Foreign Minister Kishida

Statement by South Korean Foreign Minister Yun

Summit telephone call
In the evening of the announcement by Foreign Ministers, Prime Minister of Japan Shinzo Abe and President of South Korea Park Geun-hye held talks by  telephone and confirmed the agreement made by Foreign Ministers.

Foundation
A foundation was set up in South Korea under the agreement. Japan provided 1 billion yen to the foundation.

Of the 47 women who were alive when the agreement was reached, 36 wanted to receive cash payments and 34 of them went on to receive about 10 million yen each.

Reactions
Immediately after the announcement, U.S. Secretary of State John Kerry welcomed the agreement saying " We believe this agreement will promote healing and help to improve relations between two of the United States’ most important allies. We applaud the leaders of Japan and the Republic of Korea for having the courage and vision to reach this agreement, and we call on the international community to support it."

Demise of the agreement 
Due to low public support, especially in South Korea, the agreement was starting to fall apart by 2017.

In 2019, the President Moon Jae-in administration dissolved the foundation, effectively annulling the agreement.

External links
Japanese official statements
Comfort Women Japan's Efforts on the Issue. January 14, 2021. Retrieved February 1, 2021.
Measures Taken by the Government of Japan. January 14, 2021.

References

Comfort women